Sporochnus elsieae is a marine brown algal species in the family Sporochnaceae,  endemic to New Zealand. It was first described in 1960 by Victor Lindauer who gave it the specific epithet, elsieae, in honour of his wife, Elsie.

Lindauer comments that its "most remarkable feature is the series of bull-rush like receptacles along the axes of the branchlets".

Distribution 
It is found on Stewart Island on stones in the sub-littoral.

See also

References

External links
Sporochnus elsieae occurrence data from GBIF
 Museum of New Zealand Te Papa Tongarewa: Sporochnus elsieae Lindauer (Species)

Flora of New Zealand
Sporochnaceae